Heaven Knows, Mr. Allison is a 1957 DeLuxe Color CinemaScope film that tells the story of two people stranded on a Japanese-occupied island in the Pacific Ocean during World War II.

The film was adapted by John Huston and John Lee Mahin from the 1952 novel by Charles Shaw and was directed by Huston. It was nominated for Academy Awards for Best Actress in a Leading Role (Deborah Kerr) and Best Writing, Screenplay Based on Material from Another Medium.

The movie was filmed on the islands of Trinidad and Tobago. Producer Eugene Frenke later filmed a low-budget variation on the story, The Nun and the Sergeant (1962), starring his wife Anna Sten.

Plot
In the South Pacific in 1944, U.S. Marine Corporal Allison and his reconnaissance party are disembarking from a U.S. Navy submarine when they are discovered and fired upon by the Japanese. The submarine's captain is forced to dive and leave the scouting team behind. Allison reaches a rubber raft and, after days adrift, reaches an island. He finds an abandoned settlement and a chapel with one occupant: Sister Angela, a novice Irish nun who has not yet taken her final vows. She has been on the island for only four days, having come with an elderly priest to evacuate another clergyman only to find that the Japanese had arrived first. The frightened natives who had brought them to the island left the pair without warning, and the priest died soon after.

For a while, they have the island to themselves, but then a detachment of Japanese troops arrives to set up a meteorological camp, forcing them to hide in a cave. When Sister Angela is unable to stomach the raw fish that Allison has caught, he sneaks into the Japanese camp for supplies, narrowly avoiding detection. That night, they watch flashes from naval guns being fired in a sea battle over the horizon.

The Japanese unexpectedly leave the island and Allison professes his love for Sister Angela, proposing marriage. But she shows him her engagement ring and explains that it is a symbol of her forthcoming final holy vows. Later both in celebration and frustration, Allison gets drunk on sake. He blurts out that he considers her devotion to her vows to be pointless since they are stuck on the island "like Adam and Eve." She runs out into a tropical rain and falls ill as a result. Allison, now sober and contrite, finds her shivering. He carries her back, but the Japanese have returned, forcing them to retreat to the cave. Allison sneaks into the Japanese camp to get blankets. He kills a soldier who discovers him, alerting the enemy. To force him into the open, the Japanese set fire to the vegetation.

When a Japanese soldier discovers the cave, Allison and Sister Angela have two choices: surrender or die from a hand grenade thrown inside. An ensuing explosion is not a grenade, but a bomb; the Americans have begun attacking the island in preparation for a landing. Allison comments that the landing will not be easy because when they returned, the Japanese brought four artillery pieces and concealed them well on the island.

Responding to what he attributes to a message from God, Allison disables the artillery during the barrage that will precede the American assault while the Japanese are still in their bunkers. He is wounded but sabotages all the guns by removing their breechblocks, saving many American lives. After the landing, the Marine officers are puzzled by the missing breechblocks.

Sister Angela and the wounded Allison then say their goodbyes as the Marines begin occupation. Allison has reconciled himself to Sister Angela's dedication to Jesus, though she reassures him that they will always be close "companions." After being found, Allison is transferred by the Marines to the ship, with Sister Angela walking beside him.

Cast

Production
Filming took place in Trinidad and Tobago, allowing Huston and Fox to use blocked funds in the UK, receive British film finance and qualify for the Eady Levy. The film was set later in the war than it was in the novel, which had Allison escaping from the Battle of Corregidor. In the film, the Allies are on the offensive and U.S. Marines capture the island.

The screenplay compares the rituals and commitment of the Roman Catholic Church and the United States Marine Corps. The National Legion of Decency monitored the production of the film closely, sending a representative to watch the filming; knowing this, Kerr and Mitchum ad-libbed a scene (not included in the final print) in which their characters wildly kissed and grabbed at each other.

The Marines provided troops for the invasion climax. Six Japanese persons living in Brazil played some of the leading Japanese characters, while Chinese people from some of the laundries and restaurants of Trinidad and Tobago played the rest of the Japanese soldiers.

Screen Archives Entertainment released Heaven Knows, Mr. Allison on Blu-ray on June 10, 2014.

Reception
According to Kinematograph Weekly the film was "in the money" at the British box office in 1957.

Awards and honors

See also
 List of American films of 1957

References

External links
 
 
 
 

 DVD reviews
 Comprehensive review by Glenn Erickson at DVD Savant a part of DVD Talk
 Review by Barrie Maxwell at DVD Verdict
 Review by Mark Zimmer at digitally OBSESSED!
 Review by Randy at dvdfuture.com
 Review by Steven D. Greydanus at DecentFilms

 Australia (Region 4)
 Review by Sarah Goodman at DVD Bits.com

 France (Region 2)
 Review in French at DVD Classik

1957 films
1957 drama films
1950s war drama films
20th Century Fox films
American war drama films
1950s English-language films
Films scored by Georges Auric
Films about Catholic nuns
Films about Catholicism
Films directed by John Huston
Films set on beaches
Films set on islands
Pacific War films
Films set in 1944
Films with screenplays by John Huston
Trinidad and Tobago drama films
Films about the United States Marine Corps
CinemaScope films
English-language Trinidad and Tobago films
1950s American films